The Foochow Arsenal, also known as the Fuzhou or Mawei Arsenal, was one of several shipyards created by the Qing Empire and a flagship project of French assistance to China during the Self-Strengthening Movement. The shipyard was constructed under orders from Li Hongzhang and Zuo Zongtang and was situated in Mamoi (now Mawei), a port town within the jurisdiction of Fuzhou (then romanized as "Foochow"), which is several miles up the Min River.

History
Planning for the shipyard, the Fuzhou Naval College     and other facilities began in 1866. Construction began in 1867. Two French Naval officers, Prosper Giquel and Paul d'Aiguebelle, both on leave from the French Imperial Navy, were contracted to recruit a staff of about forty European engineers and mechanics, and to oversee the construction of a metal-working forge, the creation of a Western-style naval dockyard, the construction of eleven transports and five gunboats, and the establishment of schools for training in navigation and marine engineering—all within a  five-year period. Chinese authorities provided the materials and labour, with the number of labourers rising from an initial figure of 1,600 to more than 2,000 by 1872. The operating cost over five years was estimated at 3 million taels, and the cost of maintenance of the ships produced was partly funded by revenue from duties on the import of opium. The first ship produced at the Arsenal, the 150-horsepower Qing Forever     was launched in June 1869.

The shipyard was severely damaged by French forces in 1884 during the Sino-French War of 1883–1885, in the battle of Fuzhou. A modern shipyard was later rebuilt on the site.

See also

 Chen Jitong, shipbuilder and diplomat trained at the Foochow Arsenal
 Hanyang Arsenal
 Taiyuan Arsenal
 Great Hsi-Ku Arsenal
 Jiangnan Shipyard

Notes

References
 Hong Kong Port and Maritime Board. "Chinese Ports 1996: Fuzhou; Harbour Plan". Accessed 26 September 2002.
 
 Pong, David. "Keeping the Foochow Navy Yard Afloat: Government Finance and China's Early Modern Defence Industry, 1866-75". In Modern Asian Studies, vol. 21, no. 1 (Cambridge University Press, 1987).
 Seltzer, Leon E., ed. The Columbia Lippincott Gazetteer of the World (New York: Columbia University Press, 1952).
 Thomson, John. China and its People in Early Photographs: An Unabridged Reprint of the Classic 1873/4 Work (reprint, New York: Dover Publications, 1982).
 Viénet, René. L'épisode français peu connu des Pescadores. Accessed 24 September 2002.

Military history of the Qing dynasty
Naval history of China
Shipyards of China
Major National Historical and Cultural Sites in Fujian
Arsenals
Buildings and structures in Fuzhou